Gap-dong is a 2014 South Korean television series starring Yoon Sang-hyun, Sung Dong-il, Kim Min-jung, Kim Ji-won and Lee Joon. It aired on cable channel tvN from April 11 to June 14, 2014 on Fridays and Saturdays at 20:40 (KST) time slot for 20 episodes.

The series is based on the real-life Hwaseong serial murders.

Synopsis
In 1986, the (fictional) city of Iltan in Gyeonggi Province: A young girl gets brutally murdered by an unknown person on a dark night. As the city is gripped by a succession of serial killings, a total of nine murders within a twelve-kilometer radius since 1993, the police conclude that a man they've nicknamed "Gap-dong" is behind the crimes. Detective Yang Cheol-gon is convinced that the actual killer is Ha Il-sik, a resident of the town who is intellectually challenged. His attempt to arrest the suspect fails as Ha commits suicide to prove his innocence. His death inspires his son Moo-yeom to become a police officer to clear his father's name and restore his honor.

Seventeen years later, Moo-yeom is a police detective who spends his career chasing dead ends and helping juvenile delinquents. After the statute of limitations on the case expires, Moo-yeom becomes resigned to the belief that Gap-dong is dead. But then a series of incidents occur in the town that bear an eerie resemblance to Gap-dong's crimes. Cheol-gon, now a well-decorated officer, has recently transferred back to Iltan, and to his dismay, Moo-yeom joins his investigation team to catch Gap-dong once and for all.

Cast

Main
 Yoon Sang-hyun as Ha Moo-yeom, a detective in Iltan Police Department's violent crimes unit. He vows to avenge his wrongly accused father.
 Sung Dong-il as Yang Cheol-gon, a police inspector at the time of the original murders, and is now a well-decorated officer. Upon receiving his latest promotion, he surprises his superiors by requesting to be assigned back to Iltan, because he wants to end his career by capturing Gap-dong. Still convinced that Moo-yeom's father was the killer, he is extremely prejudiced against Moo-yeom, which makes for a combative working relationship. He also hiding grief of his daughter's death.
 Kim Min-jung as Maria Oh, a psychiatrist with a mysterious double life and a suspicious curiosity for all things Gap-dong.
 Kim Ji-won as Ma Ji-wool, a 17-year-old high school student and webtoon artist with the pen name "Matilda". Ji-wool becomes pivotal to the case when her webtoon titled The Beast's Path ends up foretelling the crimes. When she becomes the killer's next target, it also serves as a set of clues to find him.
 Lee Joon as Ryu Tae-oh, an inmate of a prison psychiatric hospital, who becomes a barista after his release. With a genius IQ of 150, his excellent and detailed memory may prove valuable to cracking the case, but he also happens to have the disposition to be a dangerous psychopath, and considers Gap-dong his god and hero.

Supporting
 Jung In-gi as Cha Do-hyeok, the police section chief. He was in fact, the true culprit of the "Gap Dong" serial murders. He was sentenced to death nearing the end of the series
 Hyun Woo as young Cha Do-hyeok
 Kang Nam-gil as Han Sang-hoon, a profiler
 Jang Gwang as Jinjo, a monk
 Choo Soo-hyun as Oh Young-ae
 Lee Seung-ho as Kim Shin-yong
 Yoo Eun-ho as Yang Seon-joo, Cheol-gon's daughter
 Lee Go-eun as young Seon-joo
 Min Sung-wook as Nam Ki-ri
 Jung Won-joong as Park Joong-goo
 Jang Hee-soo as Kim Young-mi, Maria's mother
 Yoon Kyun-sang as the youngest detective
 Seo Cho-won as Supporting
 Hong In-young as Hong Sung-hee, a reporter
 Seo Joo-hee as Ji Hwa-ja, Ji-wool's mother
 Jo Ji-hwan as Lee Hyung-nyeon, Moo-yeom's partner and wife

Ratings
In this table,  represent the lowest ratings and  represent the highest ratings.

Awards and nominations

International broadcast
 It aired in Thailand on Workpoint TV beginning March 9, 2015.
 In Hong Kong, Macau, Sri Lanka and Southeast Asia, the drama began airing on tvN Asia with a variety of subtitles on 2016.

References

External links
  
 
 
 Gap-dong webtoon 

2014 South Korean television series debuts
2014 South Korean television series endings
TVN (South Korean TV channel) television dramas
Korean-language television shows
South Korean crime television series
South Korean thriller television series
Television series by Pan Entertainment